Three referendums were held in Liechtenstein during 2009. The first two were held on 29 March and concerned reforming level I of secondary schooling, which was rejected by voters and the authorization of smoking rooms in restaurants, which was approved. The third was held on 6 December on a law introduced in May 2008 which placed a stricter upper level on the electromagnetic field from phone masts, and was confirmed by voters and was approved by 57% of voters.

Results

Reform of level I of secondary education

Smoking room

Overturning the 2008 environmental protection law

References

Liechtenstein referendums
Referendums
Liechtenstein referendums
Liechtenstein referendums
2009
Health in Liechtenstein